Maximiliano Martínez may refer to:

 Maximiliano Martínez (footballer, born 1979), Argentine forward
 Maximiliano Martínez (footballer, born June 1992), Argentine midfielder
 Maximiliano Martínez (footballer, born September 1992), Argentine defender
 Maximiliano Martínez (rower); see Argentina at the 2007 Pan American Games
 Maximiliano Hernández Martínez, two time President of El Salvador